Joseph Slater Zaleski (January 15, 1966 – June 27, 1993) was a Canadian football player who played for the Edmonton Eskimos, Toronto Argonauts, and Saskatchewan Roughriders. The son of Joe Zaleski, he played football for the Edmonton Huskies prior to his CFL career. In 1992, he was studying geography at the University of Alberta. He died suddenly at the age of 27 in 1993.

References

1966 births
1993 deaths
Canadian football wide receivers
Edmonton Elks players
Toronto Argonauts players
Saskatchewan Roughriders players
Players of Canadian football from Alberta
Canadian football people from Edmonton
Canadian people of American descent